Naomi Judd (born Diana Ellen Judd; January 11, 1946 – April 30, 2022) was an American singer and actress. In 1980, she and her daughter Wynonna (born Christina Claire) formed the duo known as The Judds, which became a very successful country music act, winning five Grammy Awards and nine Country Music Association awards. The Judds ceased performing in 1991 after Naomi was diagnosed with hepatitis; while Wynonna continued to perform as a solo artist, she occasionally reunited with her mother for tours as The Judds. Naomi struggled with mental health issues throughout her life. She died from a self-inflicted gunshot wound on April 30, 2022, the day before she and Wynonna were inducted into the Country Music Hall of Fame.

Early life
Judd was born to Pauline Ruth "Polly" (née Oliver) and Charles Glen Judd on January 11, 1946, in Ashland, Kentucky. Her father owned a gas station and her mother was a riverboat cook. Her brother Brian died of leukemia in 1965 at the age of 17; Naomi Judd's first child, Christina Claire Ciminella (later Wynonna Judd), was born when Judd was 18. Her first daughter was given the last name Ciminella after Michael Ciminella, the man who Judd quickly married after being abandoned by her boyfriend and Wynonna's biological father, Charles Jordan. After the birth of her second daughter, Ashley (1968), who later became a film and stage actress, and the end of her marriage to Ciminella, Judd brought up both daughters as a single parent, first attending nursing school at California's College of Marin while living in nearby Lagunitas, California, and later beginning a successful singing career with daughter Wynonna. When she reverted to her maiden name following her divorce, she also took the opportunity to change her name, Diana, which she did not think fit "her own spiritual, rural Kentucky conception of her true heritage", and decided to pay homage to the Biblical figure Naomi, finding resonance in her story of moving to another land and eventually being left without a husband raising two women.

The Judds

With her daughter Wynonna Judd, Naomi formed the highly successful singing duo known as the Judds. As country music's most famous mother–daughter team, they scored twenty top ten hits (including fifteen number ones) and went undefeated for eight consecutive years at all three major country music awards shows. They won five Grammy Awards and a vast array of other awards and honors. Naomi won a Country Song of the Year Grammy for writing "Love Can Build a Bridge".

Breakup and solo work
The Judds broke up soon after Naomi Judd was diagnosed with hepatitis C in 1991. The band's farewell concert was the most successful musical event in cable pay-per-view history.  Judd created the Naomi Judd Education and Research Fund in 1991 to raise awareness of hepatitis C, and used the strength of her experiences as a spokes-model for the American Liver Foundation.

She received the Golden Plate Award from the American Academy of Achievement in 1993.  In 1998, she achieved virologic cure of hepatitis C following treatment with interferon alpha.  She continued to act, and in 1999 she starred as Lily Waite in the film A Holiday Romance.

The Judds reunited for a 1999 New Year's Eve concert in Phoenix at the America West Arena, with Ashley as the MC. The Judds reunited again in 2000 for their "Power to Change" tour, performing to over 300,000 people on 30 dates. The duo was nominated as the Academy of Country Music's top vocal duo of the year in 2001. From 2003 to 2004, Judd judged the revamped version of Star Search hosted by Arsenio Hall.

She began Naomi's New Morning, a Sunday morning talk show on the Hallmark Channel, in 2005. The show lasted two seasons. She was also the author of several self-help books, including Naomi's Guide to Aging Gratefully: Facts, Myths, and Good News for Boomers (2007).

Judd joined a new television reality-competition series Can You Duet, as a judge and mentor in 2008. The show aired on CMT. She starred alongside actress Laura Prepon in the 2011 Lifetime television movie The Killing Game. In 2014, she starred as "Honey" in An Evergreen Christmas. She competed with her husband,  Larry Strickland, in the first season of the Fox Broadcasting reality cooking series My Kitchen Rules in 2017.

Personal life 
Judd had two daughters, Wynonna (born 1964) and Ashley (born 1968). Wynonna is a musician and was the other half of their duo, The Judds. Ashley is an actress with a career spanning more than three decades.

Judd married her second husband, Larry Strickland of the Palmetto State Quartet, on May 6, 1989. Strickland has also sung with other gospel groups, including J.D. Sumner and The Stamps Quartet.

Death 
On April 30, 2022, Judd took her own life by firearm at her home in Leiper's Fork, Tennessee; she was 76. She had long been struggling with depression accompanied by anxiety, panic attacks, and suicidal thoughts. The medications prescribed to her, including lithium, produced side effects including facial edema, alopecia and tremors, which caused her further emotional distress.

Announcing her death, her daughters tweeted: "Today we sisters experienced a tragedy. We lost our beautiful mother to the disease of mental illness." Ashley Judd revealed the cause of her mother's death in a May 12, 2022, interview with Diane Sawyer on Good Morning America. She made the revelation to help raise awareness of mental illness, which she hoped would help those suffering from it. She also said that she and the rest of the family wanted the manner of death to be shared by them rather than a secondhand source.

A memorial for Judd was televised on CMT. Naomi Judd: A River of Time Celebration was broadcast from the Ryman Auditorium, as specified by Judd before she died and was hosted by Robin Roberts. It featured appearances from Ashley Judd, Larry Strickland, Bono, Bette Midler, Martina McBride, Reba McEntire, Reese Witherspoon, Morgan Freeman, Oprah Winfrey and Salma Hayek, plus performances by Wynonna, Brad Paisley, Carly Pearce, Ashley McBryde, Emmylou Harris and Allison Russell, Little Big Town, Brandi Carlile, and Jamey Johnson.

Discography

Singles

References

External links

 
 
 

1946 births
2022 deaths
2022 suicides
20th-century American actresses
21st-century American actresses
21st-century American singers
21st-century American women singers
Actresses from Kentucky
American country singer-songwriters
American film actresses
American motivational speakers
American motivational writers
American self-help writers
American television talk show hosts
American women country singers
Country musicians from Kentucky
Female suicides
Grammy Award winners
Kentucky women musicians
Singers from Kentucky
Musicians from Appalachia
Musicians from Ashland, Kentucky
Singer-songwriters from Kentucky
The Judds members
Women motivational speakers
Women motivational writers
Writers from Kentucky
Suicides by firearm in Tennessee